Acraea pseudepaea, Dudgeon's acraea, is a butterfly in the family Nymphalidae. It is found in Guinea, eastern Liberia, Ivory Coast, Ghana and western Nigeria.

Description
Very close to Acraea althoffi q.v for differences.

Biology
The habitat consists of forests.

Adult males mud-puddle.

Taxonomy
It is a member of the Acraea oberthueri species group.-   but see also Pierre & Bernaud, 2014

References

External links

Images representing Acraea pseudepaea at Bold.

Butterflies described in 1909
pseudepaea